The 2014 Indiana Hoosiers baseball team is a college baseball team that represented Indiana University in the 2014 NCAA Division I baseball season. The Hoosiers are members of the Big Ten Conference (B1G) and played their home games at Bart Kaufman Field in Bloomington, Indiana. They were led by ninth-year head coach Tracy Smith.

Following the conclusion of the regular season, the Hoosiers were selected to play in the 2014 NCAA Tournament, they would host the Bloomington Regional for the second consecutive year. Indiana would win the first two games to advance to the regional final where they would meet the Stanford Cardinal, the Hoosiers would lose back to back games and be eliminated from the Bloomington Regional by Stanford by a score of 4–5 in the final game.

Previous season 
The Hoosiers finished the 2013 NCAA Division I baseball season 49–16 overall (17-7 conference) and first place in conference standings. The Hoosiers were selected to play in the 2013 NCAA Tournament, beginning by hosting the Bloomington Regional. The Hoosiers swept the Bloomington Regional with three straight wins to advance to their first-ever Super Regional. The Hoosiers would travel to Tallahassee to play Florida State in the Tallahassee Super Regional. Indiana would win the first two games to clinch their first-ever birth to the College World Series in Omaha. They would win the first game 2–0 over the Louisville Cardinals after a brilliant performance from starting pitcher Joey DeNato before losing their next two games and being eliminated.

Bloomington Regional 

 Bloomington Regional Scores Source

References

Indiana
Indiana Hoosiers baseball seasons
Indiana Hoosiers baseball